Kelletia lischkei is a species of large sea snail, or whelk, a marine gastropod mollusc in the family Buccinidae, the true whelks.

Description

Kelletia lischkei is a medium-to-large species of buccinid whelk.

Distribution
The species is endemic to the Sea of Japan, and is found in coastal waters off of South Korea and eastern Japan. Fossils of K. lischkei occur in the Middle Pleistocene fossil record of Japan, and the species bears a resemblance to the extinct fossil species Kelletia brevis.

References

External links
 World Register of Marine Species: Kelletia lischkei (Kuroda, 1938)

Buccinidae
Gastropods described in 1938
Marine gastropods